Italy will compete at the 2022 European Championships in Munich from August 11 to August 22, 2022.

Medallists

Competitors
Italy enrolled 244 athletes (136 men and 108 women) in the seven sports of this edition of the European Championships.

Athletics

Beach Volleyball

Italy has qualified 4 male and 3 female pairs.

Men

Women

Cycling

Road

Men

Women

Gymnastics

Italy has entered five male and five female athletes.

Men

Qualification

Women

Qualification

Triathlon

Men

Women

Mixed

Notes

References

External links

2022
Nations at the 2022 European Championships
European Championships